Dilshad Vadsaria (born ) is an American television actress.  She is known for her role as Rebecca Logan on the ABC Family television program Greek and for the film 30 Minutes or Less.

Early life and education
Vadsaria was born in Karachi, Pakistan, and is of Indian and Portuguese descent. She moved with her family to the United States at the age of six and spent her childhood in various parts of the country, including Chicago, Richmond, and Philadelphia. She attended the University of Delaware.

Career
Vadsaria's professional acting career began in 2006 with a part in an episode of the television program Vanished. In 2007 she then landed a regular part on the television program Greek, where she played the character Rebecca Logan one of the Zeta Beta Zeta sisters, a role she portrayed through the show's run.

She also appeared in the movie, Rapture, where she played the role of a teenage mother. In 2011 Vadsaria appeared in the comedy film 30 Minutes or Less where she portrayed Kate Flanning who is the twin sister of Aziz Ansari's character Chet.

She appeared in the NCIS episode "Legend (Part 2)" (the backdoor pilot for NCIS: Los Angeles) as Shakira. In 2010 Vadsaria appeared on the Bones season 5 episode "The Dentist in the Ditch" as Padme Booth, a role she reprised in 2015. In 2012 she began a recurring role on the television series Revenge.

In 2015, Vadsaria was cast in the major role of Mary Goodwin on the FOX fantasy drama Second Chance (previously titled The Frankenstein Code and Lookinglass).

Filmography

Awards and nominations

References

External links
 
 

1985 births
Living people
Actresses from Karachi
21st-century American actresses
American film actresses
American television actresses
Pakistani emigrants to the United States
University of Delaware alumni